The NFC Institute of Engineering and Technology Multan (NFCIET) is a public university located in Multan, Punjab, Pakistan.

Overview
The institute was established in 1985 and initially affiliated with Bahauddin Zakariya University, Multan. In 2012, it got its own charter and Malik Akhtar Ali Kalrou is appointed as the first vice-chancellor.

NFC-IET offers undergraduate and postgraduate programs in various fields of engineering and technology, including Electrical, Mechanical, Chemical, Civil, Computer, and Industrial Engineering.

See also 
 NFC Institute of Engineering and Fertilizer Research, Faisalabad

References

External links 
Official website

Universities and colleges in Multan
Engineering universities and colleges in Pakistan
1985 establishments in Pakistan
Educational institutions established in 1985
Public universities and colleges in Punjab, Pakistan